The 2021–22 Rider Broncs men's basketball team represented Rider University in the 2021–22 NCAA Division I men's basketball season. The Broncs, led by tenth-year head coach Kevin Baggett, played their home games at the Alumni Gymnasium in Lawrenceville, New Jersey as members of the Metro Atlantic Athletic Conference.

Previous season
The Broncs finished the 2020–21 season 6–17 overall, 5–13 in MAAC play to finish in last place. They lost to Saint Peter's in the MAAC tournament quarterfinals.

Roster

Schedule and results 

|-
!colspan=12 style=""| Exhibition

|-
!colspan=12 style=""| Regular season

|-
!colspan=12 style=""| MAAC tournament

|-

Sources

References

Rider Broncs men's basketball seasons
Rider Broncs
Rider Broncs men's basketball
Rider Broncs men's basketball